Hard seltzer, adult seltzer, mature seltzer, spiked seltzer and hard sparkling alcohol water is a type of highball drink containing seltzer (carbonated water), alcohol, and often fruit flavorings. In the US the alcohol is usually made by fermenting cane sugar or malted barley. Hard seltzer products outside of the US have been found to use either neutral spirit, or fermentation of fruit. The alcohol by volume is around 5% and the calorie-content is relatively low.

History 
The concept of flavored malt beverages has been popular since the 1990s.  The first widely available commercial example of the style was Two Dogs which was brewed in Australia in 1993 and was claimed to be the "world’s first brewed alcoholic lemonade" (despite the pre-existence of traditional drinks like sima, a fermented Finnish drink). Two Dogs paved the way for similar commercial products such as Hooper's Hooch and Mike's Hard Lemonade. These alcoholic alternatives were commonly known as alcopops in the United Kingdom and malternatives in America.  
David White came up with the idea for Alcoholic water in 1996 when he did a school project and had to come up with a business idea. He came up with Whitey's wonder water.
The more modern renditions of Hard seltzers started with Nick Shields developing the 'Spiked Seltzer' branding style, in Westport, Connecticut, brewing the first commercial batches in November 2013.   The Hard Seltzers that we are familiar with now did not rise to popularity until almost 3 decades later in 2018. Sales of the most popular Hard Seltzer brand White Claws grew 85% in just one year making over $4 billion in 2020 alone.  Analysts attribute the success of White Claw and the appeal of hard seltzer in general to increased demand from health-conscious consumers.

Nutritional information 
Across all hard seltzer brands, there is a medium of 100 calories, 2g of carbs, 0-2g of sugar while still maintaining 5% alcohol. Additionally, most Hard Seltzers are gluten free. Seltzer marketing has claimed that these beverages offer a healthier alternative to drinking more calorically heavy alcoholic beverages. Companies use these facts to their advantage often stating the nutrition facts in easy to read and obvious places. The social media presence of Hard Seltzer companies is massive and often depict healthy people drinking and having fun, further perpetuating the notion that Hard Seltzers are a healthy alcoholic alternative.  However, although it may be ‘healthier’ in many ways, nutritionists have warned that this is not a healthy beverage. Many hard seltzers have added flavoring and are mixed with sugary soda waters to add sweetness. It also doesn’t give you any additional hydration like non-alcoholic seltzers. The calorie count is often similar to light beers so if you are choosing between a hard seltzer and a light beer, the biggest difference is the gluten content.

Branding 
In addition to advertising Hard Seltzers as the 'healthy alternative', the marketing of Hard seltzers have often relied on their trendiness. In 2019, YouTuber Trevor Wallace posted a video title “Summer of White Claw”. This video went viral and was watched over 6 million times. The aftermath of this video made White Claw (as well as other Hard Seltzer brands) sales skyrocket. After this video was released, White Claws were so popular that the surplus of sales lead to a shortage within the company. 

Many critics have pointed out that alcoholic beverage ads are often targeted to certain genders. For example, many beer companies advertise their drinks as being ‘manly’. However, seltzer companies have made a point to have gender-neutral advertising in order to reach the most amount of people possible. This genderless way of advertising is also accountable for the drinks surge in popularity. The demographics of Hard Seltzer drinkers are Caucasians who are 21 to 44 years of age. 

The rise of hard seltzers in the beer category may also be seen as a reflection of the broader surge in popularity of non-alcoholic flavored seltzers evidenced by the sudden and massive popularity of brands like LaCroix and Spindrift. On the back of this popularity, hard seltzer brands have launched in numerous countries outside of the U.S., including in Canada, Australia, Finland and the UK. In February 2020, White Claw launched in Canada and subsequently Australia and the UK.

Fermentation process 
Similarly to beer, fermentation is needed to make these drinks alcoholic. However, instead of yeast converting to glucose, the fermentation process of Hard Seltzers consists of directly fermenting a sugar base. This fermentation process yields a discoloration in the product so effective filtration practices of these colors and odors is necessary. A common filtration process consists of a carbon treatment which uses CARBOFIL RW, RHC or CA filter sheets.   This creates a plain alcohol base where flavor can be added afterwards.

Popular brands

See also
Alcopop
Chūhai
Hard soda
White Claw Hard Seltzer
Brewing
Fermentation in food processing
Fermentation in winemaking

References 

Alcoholic drinks
Carbonated drinks